Dark Star is a brewery in Partridge Green, Sussex, England.

History

Dark Star Brewery was established in 1994, brewing in the cellar of the Evening Star public house in Brighton. The beer Dark Star was originally made by Pitfield Brewery in north London before its brewer Rob Jones moved to the Evening Star. In 2001 the company moved production to Ansty, West Sussex, before moving again to Partridge Green in 2010. The new brewery has a brew length of 45 barrels and an annual capacity of 20,000 barrels.

In February 2018, Dark Star was acquired by London-based brewer, Fuller Smith & Turner, with James Cuthbertson staying on as its managing director. 
In August 2018 the brewery confirmed that some of its flagship "Hophead" pale ale was being produced by Fuller's in London.

In January 2019, Fuller Smith & Turner announced plans to sell its entire drinks business, including The Dark Star Brewing Company, to Japanese firm Asahi Breweries.

In November 2022, Asahi Breweries announced that it would close the Dark Star Brewery in Partridge Green, with the entire Dark Star portfolio moving to its Meantime Brewery in Greenwich, London.

References

External links
 Goodbeerhunting.com. Fuller’s Acquires Dark Star Brewing in Bid for Craft Cred.
 Imbibe.com. "Ultimately Dark Star is Fuller’s toy", says MD.
 365 Magazine. The Man Behind Dark Star Brewery - An Exclusive Interview With James Cuthbertson.

Mid Sussex District
Companies based in Sussex
Food and drink companies established in 1994
Breweries in England
British companies established in 1994
1994 establishments in England